Anastrepha grandis is a fruit fly, also known as the South American cucurbit fruit fly. It is a pest of various cultivated species of Cucurbitaceae, especially the pumpkin, squash and melon. Anastrepha grandis is found in almost all South American countries.

Importance to agriculture
Once a pest of minor to moderate importance generally, it has become a rather important pest. This kind of species is potentially of economic importance in Florida and southern Texas should it ever be introduced there.

References 

Trypetinae
Insect vectors of plant pathogens